Transmembrane glycoprotein NMB is a protein that in humans is encoded by the GPNMB gene. Two transcript variants encoding 560 and 572 amino acid isoforms have been characterized for this gene in humans.  The mouse and rat orthologues of GPNMB are known as DC-HIL and Osteoactivin (OA), respectively.

GPNMB is a type I transmembrane glycoprotein which shows homology to the pmel17 precursor, a melanocyte-specific protein.

GPNMB has been reported to be expressed in various cell types, including: melanocytes, osteoclasts, osteoblasts, dendritic cells, and it is overexpressed in various cancer types. In melanocytic cells and osteoclasts the GPNMB gene is transcriptionally regulated by Microphthalmia-associated transcription factor.

Function
In osteoblast progenitor cells, Osteoactivin works as a positive regulator of osteoblast differentiation during later stages of matrix maturation and mineralization that is mediated at least in part by Bone_morphogenetic_protein_2 in a SMAD1 dependent manner to promote osteoblast differentiation. In addition, using a rat fracture model, Osteoactivin (OA) enhances the repairing process in bone fracture, demonstrated by its high expression during chondrogenesis (soft callus) and osteogenesis (hard callus) compared to the intact femurs that is why Osteoactivin (OA) could be a novel therapeutic agent used to treat generalized osteoporosis or localized osteopenia during fracture repair by stimulating bone growth and regeneration. Similarly, Osteoactivin expression increases during osteoclast differentiation and it is functionally implicated in this process, possibly by promoting the fusion of osteoclast progenitor cells.

Clinical and functional significance in cancer 
GPNMB was originally identified as  a gene that was expressed in poorly metastatic human melanoma cell lines and xenografts and not expressed in highly metastatic cell lines. However, several recent studies have identified high GPNMB expression in aggressive melanoma, glioma, and breast cancer specimens.

Breast cancer
Based on Immunohistochemical analysis, two studies have shown that GPNMB is commonly expressed in breast tumors. In the first study, GPNMB was detected in 71% (10/14) of breast tumors. In the second study, 64% of human breast tumors express GPNMB in the tumor stroma and an additional 10% of tumors express GPNMB in the tumor epithelium. In this study it was reported that GPNMB expression in the tumor epithelium was an independent prognostic indicator of breast cancer recurrence. Moreover, epithelial GPNMB expression was most abundant in triple negative breast cancers and it was found to be a prognostic marker for shorter metastasis-free survival times within this breast cancer subtype. Finally, GPNMB expression in breast cancer cells is capable of promoting cell migration, invasion, and  metastasis both in vitro and in vivo.

GPNMB as a target for therapy 
GPNMB is the target of the antibody glembatumumab (CR011) which is used in the antibody-drug conjugate glembatumumab vedotin (CDX-011, CR011-vcMMAE) which is in clinical trials for melanoma and breast cancer. (See glembatumumab vedotin)

References

Further reading